Michèle Ricaud (born 28 February 1961) is a French former swimmer who competed in the 1980 Summer Olympics.

References

External links
 
 
 

1961 births
Living people
French female backstroke swimmers
Olympic swimmers of France
Swimmers at the 1980 Summer Olympics
Mediterranean Games medalists in swimming
Mediterranean Games gold medalists for France
Swimmers at the 1979 Mediterranean Games
21st-century French women
20th-century French women